Alcalá (Tomina) is a town in Bolivia. In 2010 it had an estimated population of 1094.

References

Populated places in Chuquisaca Department